Langya is a rural town in Wucheng District of Jinhua, eastern China's Zhejiang province.  it had a population of 18,000 and an area of . It is surrounded by Jiangtang Town on the north, Tangxi Town on the west, Bailongqiao Town on the east, and Shafan Township on the south.

History
In November 2017, it was inscribed to the 5th National Civilized Villages and Towns List.

Geography
Mount Langfeng is a mountain in the town.

Jinlan Reservoir is the largest body of water in the town.

The Baisha Stream, a tributary of the Jinhua River, flows through the town.

Education
 Langya School
 Langya Middle School

Attractions
Baisha Ancient Temple is a temple and scenic spot in the town.

Gallery

References

Divisions of Wucheng District
Towns of Jinhua